Hawkins! Eldridge! Hodges! Alive! At the Village Gate! is a live album by saxophonists Coleman Hawkins and Johnny Hodges with trumpeter Roy Eldridge which was recorded at the Village Gate in 1962 and released on the Verve label.

Reception

AllMusic called it "Timeless music played by some of the top veteran stylists of the swing era".

Track listing
 "Satin Doll" (Duke Ellington, Billy Strayhorn, Johnny Mercer) – 11:16
 "Perdido" (Juan Tizol) – 11:36
 "The Rabbit in Jazz" (Coleman Hawkins, Johnny Hodges) – 16:49
 "Mack the Knife" (Kurt Weill, Bertolt Brecht) – 8:29 
 "It's the Talk of the Town" (Jerry Livingston, Al J. Neiburg, Marty Symes) – 7:23 
 "Bean and the Boys" (Coleman Hawkins) – 6:58 
 "Caravan' (Ellington, Tizol, Irving Mills) – 10:30

Personnel
Coleman Hawkins – tenor saxophone
Roy Eldridge – trumpet (tracks 1-3)
Johnny Hodges – alto saxophone (tracks 1-3)
Tommy Flanagan – piano
Major Holley – bass
Eddie Locke – drums

References

Coleman Hawkins live albums
Roy Eldridge live albums
Johnny Hodges live albums
1962 live albums
Verve Records live albums
Albums produced by Creed Taylor
Albums recorded at the Village Gate